The 2017–18 CSA Provincial One-Day Challenge was a List A cricket competition that took place in South Africa from 15 October 2017 to 8 April 2018. The competition was played between the thirteen South African provincial teams and Namibia. The tournament was played in parallel with the 2017–18 Sunfoil 3-Day Cup, a first-class competition which featured the same teams. Northerns were the defending champions.

Following Namibia's fixture against Free State in February 2018, Namibia's captain Sarel Burger and vice-captain Craig Williams retired from cricket.

The final was played between Gauteng and North West at the Wanderers Stadium in Johannesburg on 8 April 2018. North West won the match to claim their first tile, beating Gauteng by 34 runs. Cricket South Africa's acting Chief Executive, Thabang Moroe, congratulated North West on winning the title.

Fixtures

October 2017

November 2017

December 2017

January 2018

February 2018

March 2018

Final

References

External links
 Series home at ESPN Cricinfo

South African domestic cricket competitions
CSA Provincial One-Day Challenge
2017–18 South African cricket season